Maxim Noreau (born May 24, 1987) is a Canadian professional ice hockey defenceman currently playing for SC Rapperswil-Jona Lakers of the National League (NL). He has formerly played in the National Hockey League (NHL) with the Minnesota Wild.

Playing career
On May 22, 2008, Noreau was signed as a free agent to a three-year entry-level contract with the Minnesota Wild. He spent most of the 2009–10 season with the Houston Aeros of the American Hockey League. He posted 52 points in 76 games to earn selection in the AHL Second All-Star Team. Noreau also made his National Hockey League debut on April 8, 2010, with the Minnesota Wild.

Following the conclusion of the 2010–11 season, Noreau was traded from the Wild to the New Jersey Devils for David McIntyre on June 16, 2011. With his rights owned by the Devils on August 1, 2011, Noreau signed a one-year European deal with HC Ambri-Piotta of the Swiss National League A. In his first season with Piotta in 2011–12, Noreau led the defense and scored 30 points in 44 games. As a result, he was selected to the NLA All-Star Team and was re-signed to a three-year contract extension on November 6, 2011. In the 2012–13 season, despite missing out on the post-season for the second consecutive season, he was again the offensive presence from the blueline for Piotta, contributing with 10 goals and 35 assists to lead the league in defensive scoring.

Noreau posted 102 points in 146 games over three seasons before he was released from the final year of his contract with Ambri-Piotta to sign a two-year, one-way contract with the Colorado Avalanche on July 7, 2014. He spent the entirety of his contract within the Avalanche's AHL affiliates. During the 2014–15 season with the Lake Erie Monsters, he was leading defensemen with 30 points in 39 games before he suffered a season-ending injury. In the following season, Noreau was reassigned to new AHL affiliate, the San Antonio Rampage, again leading the blueline in scoring, placing second overall among the Rampage with 45 points in 64 games.

In April 2016, unable to further his NHL career, Noreau put pen to paper on a two-year deal to return to Switzerland with SC Bern of the NLA 

On March 1, 2018, Noreau agreed to a two-year contract with rival NL club, the ZSC Lions, worth CHF 1.8 million, starting from the 2018–19 season.

International play
 

In December 2016, he won his second Spengler Cup with Team Canada and was named to the tournament's all-star team. One year later, he captained Canada to another victory at the Spengler Cup.

In January 2022, Noreau was selected to play for Team Canada at the 2022 Winter Olympics, marking his second consecutive Olympic appearance.

Personal
His younger brother, Samuel Noreau, is a professional hockey player currently with the Missouri Mavericks of the ECHL; he was formerly a prospect within the New York Rangers organization.

Career statistics

Regular season and playoffs

International

Awards and honours

References

External links

1987 births
Living people
HC Ambrì-Piotta players
SC Bern players
Canadian ice hockey defencemen
Ice hockey people from Montreal
Houston Aeros (1994–2013) players
Lake Erie Monsters players
Minnesota Wild players
Olympic ice hockey players of Canada
Ice hockey players at the 2018 Winter Olympics
Ice hockey players at the 2022 Winter Olympics
Olympic bronze medalists for Canada
Medalists at the 2018 Winter Olympics
Olympic medalists in ice hockey
SC Rapperswil-Jona Lakers players
San Antonio Rampage players
Texas Wildcatters players
Undrafted National Hockey League players
Victoriaville Tigres players
ZSC Lions players
Canadian expatriate ice hockey players in Switzerland